Jorg may refer to:

 Jorg Gray, California-based brand of men's and women's watches
 Jorg Smeets (born 1970), Dutch former footballer
 A battle mech used by the Makron (Quake character), a video game character

See also
 Jörg